Pedro Cipriano (born February 7, 1983) is an American-Cape Verdean basketball coach and former player who is currently an assistant coach at Saint Peter's University.

Early life
Born in Jersey City, New Jersey, Cipriano graduated from St. Anthony High School and played basketball at St. Anthony under coach Bob Hurley.

Collegiate career
Going by "Peter", Cipriano attended and played basketball  at Southern University from 2002 to 2006. As a senior on the team that won the 2006 SWAC Tournament, Cipriano had 10.2 points and 8.5 rebounds per game.

Professional playing career
He played professionally from 2006 to 2011 for various European teams.

In the 2006–2007 season, he played for BG Karlsruhe of the German Basketball Bundesliga with jersey #15. He averaged 6.5 points and 5.9 rebounds per game.

Cipriano signed with Kouvot in the Finnish Korisliiga for the 2007–2008 postseason, with jersey #4. Helping Kouvot make the 2008 Korisliiga Finals, Cipriano averaged 7.7 points and 6.2 rebounds per game.

In the 2008–2009 season, Cipriano played for the Norrköping Dolphins of the Swedish Basketligan, with jersey #10. Cipriano averaged 7.0 points and 7.0 rebounds per game. The Dolphins advanced to the 2009 Basketligan semifinals.

For three games in October 2009, Cirpiano played for PBG Basket Poznań of the Polish Basketball League. Cipriano then played 11 games for Eco Örebro of Swedish Basketligan from February to March 2010 with 7.5 points and 10.0 rebounds per game. Cipriano returned to the team for the 2010–11 season, averaging 7.1 points and 7.5 rebounds per game. He wore jersey #10 with Örebro.

International career
A member of the Cape Verde national basketball team, Cipriano joined Cape Verde after they won a bronze medal at the FIBA Africa Championship 2007, qualifying for a wildcard tournament for the 2008 Summer Olympics.

Coaching career
After completing his bachelor's degree at Southern University in 2013, Cipriano became an assistant coach in Roman Banks's staff in the 2013–14 season.

References

1983 births
Living people
American men's basketball coaches
American men's basketball players
American expatriate basketball people in Finland
American expatriate basketball people in Germany
American expatriate basketball people in Poland
American expatriate basketball people in Sweden
American people of Cape Verdean descent
Basketball players from Jersey City, New Jersey
BG Karlsruhe players
Cape Verdean men's basketball players
Cape Verdean people of American descent
Norrköping Dolphins players
Power forwards (basketball)
Saint Peter's Peacocks men's basketball coaches
Small forwards
Southern Jaguars basketball coaches
Southern Jaguars basketball players
Sportspeople from Jersey City, New Jersey
St. Anthony High School (New Jersey) alumni